Arthur William Phoenix Young Jeffes (born 21 July 1978, Paddington, London, England) is an English composer, musician, and arctic explorer. He is the frontman of the musical group Penguin Cafe, a group he formed in 2007 to play the music of his father's band, the Penguin Cafe Orchestra. He is one half of the band Sundog.

Early life 
Jeffes was born in London to the artist Emily Young and musician and composer, Simon Jeffes. Jeffes's interest in experimental music was recognised by his father when he took a hammer to the keys of his father's piano. He read Archaeology and Anthropology at Trinity College, Cambridge.

Penguin Cafe 
In 2007,  original members of  Penguin Cafe Orchestra performed a series of three memorial concerts, with Arthur Jeffes performing onstage with the band for the first time, to mark ten years since Simon Jeffes' death. Encouraged by the public response to the Union Chapel concerts, which all sold out, Jeffes decided that keeping his father's music alive was a worthwhile endeavour. He founded a new band, Penguin Cafe, with a new line-up, including Cass Browne of Gorillaz, Neil Codling of Suede, Oli Langford of Florence and the Machine and Darren Berry of Razorlight. Penguin Cafe have performed on stage playing works of Simon Jeffes and their own pieces.

International Space Orchestra 
In 2012, Jeffes was commissioned by the artist Nelly Ben-Hayoun to write several pieces for the NASA Kepler mission, to be played by the International Space Orchestra. The pieces "1420" and "Aurora" were beamed into space in 2013. "1420" was inspired by the WOW! signal.

Other work 
Jeffes has also formed recording duos with violinist Oli Langford as Sundog, and with pianist Mark Springer as Aparat.

Discography 
Penguin Cafe
 A Matter of Life... (2011)
 The Red Book (2014)
 The Imperfect Sea (2017)
 Handfuls of Nights (2019)

Sundog
 Insofar (2012)

Aparat
 Aparat (2016)

References 

1978 births
Alumni of Trinity College, Cambridge
English folk musicians
English jazz musicians
English male composers
Living people
Musicians from London
Penguin Cafe members